Arthur Alec Hoskings (1872 – 16 February 1945) was an Australian-born  cricketer.

Early life
Hoskings was born in Sydney, New South Wales, one of six children and the younger of two boys of Emily (née Barrett) and William Henry Hoskings. The first child of the family and his only brother was the architect Archer Hoskings. His early education was at Burwood Public School. In 1885 he commenced his senior education at Newington College aged 13 in Form One. At the time his family lived in Middleton Street, Stanmore, immediately behind the college grounds and he was a day boy.

Hoskings appears in the cricket pages of the school magazine, The Newingtonian and is reported to have played in a number of matches. He moves to Perth when his brother moves there from London to practice as an architect.

Cricket career
Hoskings was a right-handed batsman. He played one first-class match for Western Australia in April 1899, top-scoring in each innings with 26 and 53. He later settled in the US, and played a cricket match for New York City in 1912 against Ireland. The following year he played his second, and final, first-class match, this time for a combined Canada/USA team against his native Australia. In the 1912 season, playing for the New York Veterans Cricket Club, he scored more than 1000 runs and took more than 100 wickets.

References

External links

1872 births
1945 deaths
American cricketers
Australian cricketers
Western Australia cricketers
Cricketers from Sydney
People educated at Newington College